Linden is an 'L' station and the northern terminus of CTA's Purple Line. It is the only 'L' stop in Wilmette, Illinois, and is located at 349 Linden Avenue.

History

The original station opened in 1912, with a station house designed by Arthur Gerber added in 1913. In 1984, it was added to the National Register of Historic Places. A new station was built close to the original station from October 1991 until September 1993; the original station house has since been converted into retail space.

Location
The station is located at 349 Linden Avenue in Wilmette, Illinois. It is the northernmost 'L' station in the CTA system, and it is the only remaining station on the Purple Line at ground level after the line descends from the elevated embankment shortly after crossing the North Shore Channel and entering Wilmette. An older station structure, the Linden Avenue Terminal, remains; it is listed on the National Register of Historic Places. The station is only a few blocks west of the Baháʼí House of Worship, and is about a mile east of Metra's Wilmette station. There is a small train yard, know as Linden Yard, adjacent to the station.

Bus connections 
Pace

  421 Wilmette Avenue (weekday rush hours only) 
  422 Linden CTA/Glenview/Northbrook Court (weekdays only) 
  423 Linden CTA/The Glen/Harlem CTA (weekdays only)

References

References

External links

 Linden Station Page at Chicago-L.Org

 Linden Station Page CTA official site
 Linden Avenue entrance from Google Maps Street View

1912 establishments in Illinois
Buildings and structures in Wilmette, Illinois
Chicago "L" terminal stations
CTA Purple Line stations
Buildings and structures on the National Register of Historic Places in Cook County, Illinois
Railway stations on the National Register of Historic Places in Illinois
Railway stations in the United States opened in 1912